The 2021–22 Sunshine Tour was the 22nd season of professional golf tournaments since the southern Africa-based Sunshine Tour was relaunched in 2000. The Sunshine Tour represents the highest level of competition for male professional golfers in the region.

The tour is based predominantly in South Africa with other events originally being scheduled in Eswatini, Zambia and Kenya.

European Tour partnership
The season marked the start of a partnership between the Sunshine Tour and the European Tour. As part of the agreement, the top three players on the Sunshine Tour Order of Merit (not otherwise exempt) gained status to play on the European Tour for the following season.

Schedule
The following table lists official events during the 2021–22 season.

Order of Merit
The Order of Merit was based on prize money won during the season, calculated in South African rand. The top three players on the tour (not otherwise exempt) earned status to play on the 2023 European Tour.

Awards

Notes

References

External links

Sunshine Tour
Sunshine Tour
Sunshine Tour